The IIHF European Junior Championships were an annual ice hockey tournament organized by the International Ice Hockey Federation and held from 1968 to 1998, with an unofficial tournament being held in 1967. The tournament was played as a U19 tournament from 1968 to 1976. In 1977, the IIHF created the IIHF World Junior Championships, and the U19 championships became U18.  The tournament was dominated by the Russians (and Soviets), Czechs (and Czechoslovaks), Swedes and Finns, winning all but two of the medals in the 31 years it was held.

The U18 Championships remained strong until 1999, when the new IIHF World U18 Championships were introduced, thus rendering the U18 European Championships redundant. Two European Divisions continued until 2000, but were tiered qualifiers, alongside Asian Divisions, with promotion and relegation to the World Group B.

Champions

U19

U18

Medal table

European Division I (Qualifier for World Group B)

Overall participation totals
Over the history of the tournament there were 31 'A', 30 'B', 21 'C', and 4 'D' championshipsIn 1976 Group 'A' grew from six members to eight.

Former nations are italicized and listed separately from nations that continued in their stead.
In Group A participation totals include withdrawals (or forfeitures) by Bulgaria, Poland and Romania.  Likewise Greece's only appearance is listed despite not being official because of forfeit.

References

Year by year complete results with notes and commentary in french at Passionhockey.com
  Description of tournament and tabled results up to 1997.

 
International Ice Hockey Federation tournaments
International ice hockey competitions for junior teams